Robot Scientist (also known as Adam) is a laboratory robot created and developed by a group of scientists including Ross King, Kenneth Whelan, Ffion Jones, Philip Reiser, Christopher Bryant, Stephen Muggleton, Douglas Kell, Emma Byrne and Steve Oliver.

Prototype
As a prototype for a "robot scientist", Adam is able to perform independent experiments to test hypotheses and interpret findings without human guidance, removing some of the drudgery of laboratory experimentation. Adam is capable of:

 hypothesizing to explain observations
 devising experiments to test these hypotheses
 physically running the experiments using laboratory robotics
 interpreting the results from the experiments
 repeating the cycle as required

While researching yeast-based functional genomics, Adam became the first machine in history to have discovered new scientific knowledge independently of its human creators.

Adam and Eve
Adam's research studied baker's yeast (Saccharomyces cerevisiae) and is one of two robot scientists along with "Eve" (named after Adam and Eve), a robot currently doing research on drug screening.

Eve has been used for semi-automated testing for reproducibility of experimental cancer research.

References

See also

Graffiti (program)

Aberystwyth University
College and university associations and consortia in the United Kingdom
Engineering and Physical Sciences Research Council
Laboratory robots
Robots of the United Kingdom
2000s robots
Department of Computer Science, University of Manchester